Mallory Ann McMorrow (born August 23, 1986) is an American politician who has served in the Michigan Senate since January 2019. She became senate majority whip on January 1, 2023. A member of the Democratic Party, she represents the 8th district; before that, she represented 13th district from 2019 to 2023, the area includes Berkley, Birmingham, Bloomfield Hills, Clawson, Rochester Hills, Royal Oak, and Troy, Michigan. Prior to running for the Michigan Senate, McMorrow worked in industrial design.

Early life and education 
McMorrow was born in the Whitehouse section of Readington Township, New Jersey and graduated from Hunterdon Central Regional High School. She was raised Catholic and her family was active in their local parish. McMorrow sang in her church choir, and her mother taught Confraternity of Christian Doctrine (CCD) classes. However, her parents divorced, and their priest called her mother "disappointing" and said she was "not living up to the Church's expectations" as he had not seen her in church. McMorrow said that on Sundays, she and her mother volunteered at local soup kitchens outside of the diocese.

McMorrow received a Bachelor of Arts in industrial design from the University of Notre Dame in 2008. During her junior year at Notre Dame, she won a public design contest for the 2018 version of the Mazda3. She also finished in second in a contest to design the logo for the Indiana Toll Road. After graduation, McMorrow worked for design firms in New York and Los Angeles, as well as for Mattel and Gawker, before moving to Michigan.

Political career 
McMorrow participated in the 2017 Women's March in Detroit, and began writing postcards to Betsy DeVos, the U.S. Secretary of Education, challenging positions of the Trump administration. She applied to Emerge America's Michigan chapter, which provides training to political candidates.

In 2018, McMorrow ran for the Michigan Senate, seeking to represent Michigan's 13th Senate district. She was unopposed in the Democratic Party's primary election, and faced incumbent Republican senator Marty Knollenberg in the general election. McMorrow defeated Knollenberg, receiving 52 percent of the vote, with 73,138 votes to Knollenberg's 67,798. Michigan Senate Democrats chose McMorrow to serve as the assistant minority floor leader.
  
McMorrow supports expanding investment in renewable energy practices and funding clean water initiatives in her district. She supports LGBT rights, renewable energy initiatives, and gun control.

In January 2020, McMorrow, lobbyist Melissa Osborn and Michigan Advance reporter Allison Donahue accused Republican state Senator Peter Lucido of sexual harassment. McMorrow stated that Lucido touched her lower back and upper buttocks in November 2018, shortly after she was elected to the state senate, and made comments during a training session that suggested she won her election because of her appearance.

In June 2021, McMorrow introduced Senate Resolution 57, the third time it had been introduced, which proposed to declare June as Gun Violence Awareness Month. The resolution was not adopted by the senate, instead being referred to the State Government Operations Committee. She also introduced Senate Resolution 58, which asked the United States Congress to authorize the installation of electric vehicle charging stations at rest areas along the Interstate Highway System and allow charging station providers to charge a fee for public use of the stations. Also that month, she co-sponsored the reintroduction of Senate Resolution 60, introduced by Senator Jeremy Moss, which proposed declaring June as Pride Month in Michigan. The resolution was adopted.

In April 2022, Republican State Senator Lana Theis claimed in a campaign fundraising email that McMorrow wanted to "groom and sexualize kindergartners." On April 19, 2022, McMorrow took to the senate floor to defend herself against Theis' accusations, stating:

"I am the biggest threat to your hollow, hateful scheme. Because you can't claim that you are targeting marginalized kids in the name of 'parental rights' if another parent is standing up to say no. You say, 'She's a groomer. She supports pedophilia. She wants children to believe that they were responsible for slavery and to feel bad about themselves because they're white.' I am a straight, white, Christian, married, suburban mom who knows that the very notion that learning about slavery or redlining or systemic racism somehow means that children are being taught to feel bad or hate themselves because they are white is absolute nonsense. No child alive today is responsible for slavery. No one in this room is responsible for slavery. But each and every single one of us bears responsibility for writing the next chapter of history... we are not responsible for the past. We also cannot change the past. We can't pretend that it didn't happen, or deny people their very right to exist."

Neither Theis nor the Michigan Republican Party apologized for the false accusations, and Theis did not respond to McMorrow's speech on the senate floor. McMorrow's speech, which she uploaded to social media platforms, received over one million views just a few hours after it was posted. As of May 26, 2022, the video of McMorrow's speech has more than 15 million views on Twitter alone.

During redistricting following the 2020 United States census, prior to the 2022 elections, Michigan's independent redistricting commission merged McMorrow's district with the district represented by fellow Democrat Marshall Bullock. In the primary election held August 2, 2022, McMorrow defeated Bullock for the Democratic Party's nomination for the 8th District. McMorrow went on to defeat her opponent, Brandon Ronald Simpson in November general election. On November 17, 2022, McMorrow announced that she would serve as senate majority whip in 102nd senate session.

Electoral history

Personal life 
McMorrow married Ray Wert who formerly headed Gawker's content sales department and was also a former editor of the weblog Jalopnik. The wedding was held in June 2017 in the Eastern Market district of Detroit. They have a daughter, who was born in January 2021, and live in Royal Oak, Michigan. Wert is Jewish and McMorrow is a practicing Christian although she does not identify with any denomination.

References

External links
 Official Senate Profile

21st-century American politicians
21st-century American women politicians
Living people
Democratic Party Michigan state senators
Hunterdon Central Regional High School alumni
People from Royal Oak, Michigan
People from Readington Township, New Jersey
New Jersey politicians
University of Notre Dame alumni
Women state legislators in Michigan
1986 births
Former Roman Catholics